is a Japanese footballer who plays for Kyoto Sanga FC.

Club statistics
Updated to 20 July 2022.

References

External links

Profile at Gainare Tottori

1997 births
Living people
Association football people from Shiga Prefecture
Japanese footballers
J1 League players
J3 League players
Gainare Tottori players
Kyoto Sanga FC players
Association football midfielders